Paige Williams may refer to:

Paige Williams (artist), b. 1965, American artist
Paige Williams (author), American journalist and author
Paige Williams (footballer), b. 1995, English football player